HMS Shark was one of three s built for the Royal Navy in the 1890s. Completed in 1895 she served in home waters and was sold for scrap in 1911.

Description
Ordered as part of the 1893–1894 Naval Programme, the Rocket-class torpedo boat destroyers were J & G Thompson's first such ships. They were powered by a pair of triple-expansion steam engines, each driving a single propeller shaft using steam provided by four Normand boilers. Their crew numbered 53 officers and ratings.

The ships were armed with a single quick-firing (QF) 12-pounder (3 in (76 mm) Mk I gun and five QF 6-pounder Mk I Hotchkiss guns in single mounts. Their torpedo armament consisted of two rotating torpedo tubes for 18-inch (450 mm) torpedoes, one mount amidships and the other on the stern.

Construction and career
Shark was laid down by J & G Thompson at its Clydebank shipyard on 14 February 1894, launched on 22 September and completed in July 1895. Shark served in the Channel Squadron in home waters throughout her career. She took part in the Coronation Review for King Edward VII on 16 August 1902, with lieutenant A. S. Susmann temporarily in command from 8 August. The following month she was replaced as tender on 11 September and paid off into the D Division of the Devonport Fleet Reserve.

Shark was sold for scrap at Devonport for £1575 on 11 July 1911.

References

Bibliography

*

Rocket-class destroyers
Ships built on the River Clyde
1894 ships
A-class destroyers (1913)